Kuala Sentul is a state constituency in Pahang, Malaysia, that is represented in the Pahang State Legislative Assembly.

Demographics

History

Polling districts 
According to the federal gazette issued on 30 October 2022, the Kuala Sentul constituency is divided into 8 polling districts.

Representation history

Election results

References 

Pahang state constituencies